The 1956 North Dakota gubernatorial election was held on November 6, 1956. Republican nominee John E. Davis defeated Democratic nominee Wallace E. Warner with 58.46% of the vote.

Primary elections
Primary elections were held on June 26, 1956.

Democratic primary

Candidates
Wallace E. Warner, former North Dakota Attorney General

Results

Republican primary

Candidates
John E. Davis, State Senator
Ray Schnell, former Lieutenant Governor

Results

General election

Candidates
John E. Davis, Republican 
Wallace E. Warner, Democratic

Results

References

1956
North Dakota
Gubernatorial